Svend Aage Rask (14 July 1935 – 29 June 2020) was a Danish footballer. During his club career he played for Boldklubben 1909. He earned 1 cap for the Denmark national football team, and was in the finals squad for the 1964 European Nations' Cup.

References

External links
Profile at DBU

1935 births
2020 deaths
Danish men's footballers
Denmark international footballers
1964 European Nations' Cup players
Association football goalkeepers